The Raid on Port Dover was an episode during the War of 1812. American troops crossed Lake Erie to capture or destroy stocks of grain and destroy mills at Port Dover, Ontario, which were used to provide flour for British troops stationed on the Niagara Peninsula. At the instigation of Lieutenant Colonel John B. Campbell and without sanction from his superiors or the government of the United States, the Americans also destroyed private houses and other property, prompting British commanders to demand reprisals in other theatres of the war. To some degree, the burning of Washington by the British later in the year was influenced by the American actions at Port Dover.

Background
In the spring of 1814, the Americans were preparing to make an attack across the Niagara River. As the Americans held undisputed control of Lake Erie, the troops at Presque Isle on the lake's southern shore were no longer needed to protect the improvised shipyard there, and were ordered to join the main American army at Buffalo, New York.

The idea of raiding the Canadian settlements near Long Point and destroying the mills there en route to Buffalo occurred both to Captain Arthur Sinclair, commanding the armed vessels of the United States Navy on Lake Erie, and Lieutenant Colonel John B. Campbell, commanding the troops at Presque Isle.

It took some days to assemble the expedition, in particular to obtain volunteers from the Pennsylvania Militia, and Sinclair later considered that the delay and publicity prevented the raid from achieving surprise. On 13 May 750 troops, composed of detachments of regulars (including artillery) and Pennsylvania militia, were embarked aboard Sinclair's ships. The expedition was accompanied by several renegade Canadian guides, including Abraham Markle.

Raid
In the late afternoon of 14 May, the Americans landed near Port Dover. There was a minor skirmish between American militiamen and some Canadian militiamen who were trying to remove goods from a storehouse.

The Americans remained where they had disembarked during the night of 14 May. The next day, they marched to the village of Dover, where they drew up in formal line of battle, although there was no opposition. On Campbell's orders they then set fire to every building in the settlement: twenty houses, three flour mills, three sawmills, three distilleries, twelve barns and some other buildings. All livestock was shot, and their bodies left to rot. Some of Sinclair's sailors took the hind ends of the slaughtered hogs, but other than these opportune thefts, there was no plundering. Although the local women and children were allowed to remove their personal possessions from their houses before they were set on fire, they were able to remove only small items.

Much of the property destroyed had belonged to Robert Nichol, who was noted for his support for the British authorities, at the instigation of Markle, who had been expelled from the local Legislative Assembly by Nichol.

The Americans then re-embarked, but landed again the next day to burn another mill and a sawmill. They then returned to Presque Isle. During the entire raid, the only opposition had been some scattered Canadian militia, and a troop of the 19th Light Dragoons. The British had either received word of the impending raid, or had taken precautions against the possibility, and almost all the flour in the settlement (several hundred barrels) had already been removed to safety.

Aftermath

Sinclair and several other American officers (particularly among the militia) were enraged by Campbell's actions. Campbell insisted, both at the time and subsequently in a note to the British Major General Phineas Riall, commanding the division on the Niagara Peninsula, that he personally ordered the destruction without any sanction from his superiors or the United States government, in retaliation for the burning of the American settlements of Havre de Grace (on Chesapeake Bay), Lewiston and Buffalo the previous year.

The official notes of protest from Riall and complaints by Sinclair and other Americans prompted the United States Army to hold a Court of Enquiry, presided over by Brigadier General Winfield Scott, on 20 June. The court concluded that Campbell was justified in burning the mills and distilleries which might have been used to supply flour and spirits to the British forces, and that some adjacent buildings were unavoidably involved. However, Campbell was found to have made an error of judgement in destroying private houses and other buildings. No further disciplinary action was taken at the time, and Campbell was mortally wounded at the Battle of Chippawa on 5 July.

British response
Lieutenant General Sir George Prevost, the Governor General of the Canadas and commander in chief of the forces there, wrote on 2 June to Vice Admiral Sir Alexander Cochrane, commander of the North American Station of the Royal Navy, without noting that Campbell had not acted under orders:

...in consequence of the late disgraceful conduct of the American troops in the wanton destruction of private property on the north shores of Lake Erie, in order that if the war with the United States continues you may, should you judge it advisable, assist in inflicting that measure of retaliation which shall deter the enemy from a repetition of similar outrages.

Cochrane in turn wrote from his station in Bermuda on 18 June to John Wilson Croker, the Secretary to the Admiralty:

I am most decidedly of opinion that the readiest way to attain this object is to bring home to the supporters of the Government which authorizes this unnatural system of warfare a full share of its dreadful calamities and to this end, I have issued to the commanding officer of H.M. blockading squadron an order, accompanied by a secret memorandum...

ORDER FOR RETALIATION
No. 1
By the Honorable  Alexander Cochrane, K.B. &c, &c, &c.

Whereas... it appears that the American troops in Upper Canada have committed the most wanton and unjustifiable outrages on the unoffending inhabitants by burning their mills and houses, and by a general devastation of private property...

You are hereby required and directed to destroy and lay waste such towns and districts as you may find assailable. You will hold strictly in view the conduct of the American army towards His Majesty's unoffending Canadian subjects and you will spare merely the lives of the unarmed inhabitants of the United States.

In the appended secret memorandum, Cochrane modified these severe orders by instructing his commanders to spare places which furnished supplies to British ships or troops, or to levy contributions in return for forbearance, in proportion to the value of goods and buildings spared. This code of conduct was followed by the British during the Raid on Alexandria.

References
Footnotes

Citations

Sources
  
 
 
 
 Zaslow, Morris (ed) The Defended Border, Macmillan of Canada, 1964,

External links
 
 

Conflicts in 1814
Battles of the War of 1812 in Ontario
Battles on the Niagara Frontier
1814 in Upper Canada
Military raids
History of Norfolk County, Ontario
May 1814 events